The Confessor (short for Confessor of the Faith) is a title bestowed by some Christian denominations. Those so honored include:

Basil the Confessor (died 750), Eastern Orthodox saint and monk
Saint Chariton, 3rd-4th-century saint
Edward the Confessor (1003/1005–1066), one of the last Anglo-Saxon kings of England, Roman Catholic saint
Ernest I, Duke of Brunswick-Lüneburg (1497–1546), early champion of the Protestant Reformation
George the Confessor (died 814), Bishop of Antioch in Pisidia
George the Standard-Bearer (died 821), Archbishop of Mytilene 
Isaac of Dalmatia (died 383 or 396), Orthodox saint, monk and founder of a monastery
Jacob of Nisibis (died 4th century), Bishop of Nisibis
Luka (Voyno-Yasenetsky) (died 1961), Eastern Orthodox saint and bishop
Pope Martin I (590/600–655), Catholic and Orthodox saint
Maximus the Confessor (c. 580–662), Byzantine civil servant, Christian monk, theologian and scholar
Michael of Synnada (died 826), Catholic and Orthodox saint, bishop of Synnada
Nicetas of Medikion, (died 824), iconophile monk and Orthodox saint
Nicetas the Patrician (761/62–836), iconophile monk and Orthodox saint
Paphnutius of Thebes (died 4th century), bishop and saint
Paul I of Constantinople (died c. 350), bishop of Constantinople, Roman Catholic and Orthodox saint
Samuel the Confessor (597–693), Coptic Orthodox saint, founder of a monastery
Theophanes the Confessor (c. 758/760–817/818), Byzantine aristocrat, monk and chronicler, Roman Catholic and Orthodox saint

Lists of Christians
Lists of saints